George Savin  (born 1860) was a Welsh international footballer. He was part of the Wales national football team, playing 1 match on 23 March 1878 against Scotland.

See also
 List of Wales international footballers (alphabetical)
 List of Wales international footballers born outside Wales

References

1860 births
Welsh footballers
Wales international footballers
Place of birth missing
Year of death missing
Association football wingers